The Latin Songwriters Hall of Fame (LSHOF) is an honor by its board of directors to "educate, preserve, honor and celebrate the legacy of the greatest Latin songwriters from all over the world and their music in every genre." The LSHOF recognizes songwriters from Spanish and Portuguese-speaking regions internationally. It was founded by songwriters Rudy Pérez and Desmond Child and the inaugural award ceremony began in 2013. LSHOF has members who come from Spanish- and Portuguese-speaking regions of Latin America, Europe, and the United States. In addition to inducting Latin Songwriters into the Hall of Fame, the LSHOF also awards the Premio De La Voz Musa (The Muse Voice Award) which is given to five inductees and "other special award recipients". Winners are selected by through an online survey.

Inductees of the Songwriters Hall of Fame

Special awards

2013 Special Awards
La Musa Recipients: Nat King Cole, Olga Guillot, Natalia Jiménez, Ralph S. Peer, Draco Rosa, Prince Royce, Olga Tañón, Consuelo Velázquez, and Andy Garcia.
Desi Arnaz Pioneer Award Desi Arnaz

2014 Special Awards
Premio Icono: Alejandro Sanz
Premio Triunfador: Miguel
Premio Conquistador: Jencarlos Canela
Premio La Musa Elena Casals: Marlow Rosado
Premio Editores Ralph S. Peer: Zach Horowitz
Desi Arnaz Pioneer Award: Raul Alarcon Sr.
La Canción De Todos Los Tiempos: "El Día Que Me Quieras"

2015 Special Awards
Premio Conquistador (Conqueror Award): Beto Cuevas
Leyenda En Vida (Living Legend): Emilio Estefan
Premio Triunfador (Hero’s Award): Fonseca
Premio La Musa Elena Casals (La Musa Elena Casals Award): Alejandra Guzman
Premio Pionero Desi Arnaz (Desi Arnaz Pioneer Award): Quincy Jones
Premio de Los Fundadores (Founders Award): John LoFrumento
Premio Legado (Legacy Award): Rita Moreno
Premio Editores Ralph S. Peer (Publishers Award): Jose Perdomo
La Canción De Todos Los Tiempos (Towering Song): "Guantanamera" by Joseíto Fernandez

2016 Special Awards
Premio Conquistador (Conqueror Award): Yotuel Romero
Premio Triunfador: Yandel
Premio La Musa Elena Casals (La Musa Elena Casals Award): Julieta Venegas
Premio Pionero Desi Arnaz (Desi Arnaz Pioneer Award): Angelo Diaz
Premio de Los Fundadores (Founders Award): Linda Moran
Premio Legado (Legacy Award): Larry Harlow
Premio Editores Ralph S. Peer (Publishers Award): Jorge Mejía
La Canción De Todos Los Tiempos (Towering Song): "Oye Como Va" by Tito Puente

2017 Special Awards
Premio Conquistador (Conqueror Award): Horacio Palencia
Premio Triunfador: Wisin
Premio La Musa Elena Casals (La Musa Elena Casals Award): Ednita Nazario
Premio Pionero Desi Arnaz (Desi Arnaz Pioneer Award): Afo Verde
Tribute To Julio Jaramillo: Charlie Zaa
Premio Legado (Legacy Award): Julio Jaramillo
Premio Editores Ralph S. Peer (Publishers Award): Ralph Peer
Posthumous Inductee: Gustavo Cerati
La Canción De Todos Los Tiempos (Towering Song): "La Bamba" by Ritchie Valens
Song of the Year: "Despacito" by Luis Fonsi, Daddy Yankee and Erika Ender

References

Awards established in 2013
Music halls of fame
Latin music awards
Songwriting awards
Halls of fame in Florida
Organizations based in Miami
2013 establishments in Florida

External link

Writers halls of fame